John Patrick Gillespie (February 25, 1900 – February 15, 1954) was a pitcher in Major League Baseball who played for the Cincinnati Reds in its 1922 season. 
Listed at 5' 11", 172 lb., he batted and threw right handed.

Sources
. or Retrosheet

1900 births
1954 deaths
Albany Senators players
Baseball players from Oakland, California
Bridgeport Americans players 
Bridgeport Bears (baseball) players
Calgary Bronchos players
Cincinnati Reds players
Major League Baseball pitchers
Seattle Indians players